The Master of Signa refers to an anonymous 15th-century Italian painter active in the area of Signa, region of Tuscany, Italy.

External links

Signa
People from Signa
15th-century Italian painters
Painters from Tuscany